Owen Wade may refer to:

 Owen Wade (physician)
 Owen Wade (politician)